Laura Jane Haddock (born 21 August 1985) is an English actress. She is known for portraying Zoë Walker in White Lines, Kacie Carter in Honest, Lucrezia in Da Vinci's Demons, Meredith Quill in Guardians of the Galaxy and its sequel Guardians of the Galaxy Vol. 2, Alison in The Inbetweeners Movie and Viviane Wembly in Transformers: The Last Knight.

Early life
Haddock was born in Enfield, London, to a reflexologist mother and a financier father. She was raised in Harpenden, Hertfordshire, where she attended St George's School. She left school at the age of 17 and moved to London to study drama. She trained at Arts Educational School in Chiswick.

Career
Haddock made her television debut in the television pilot Plus One, part of the Comedy Showcase 2008. Her other television credits include The Palace, My Family, The Colour of Magic, Marple: A Pocket Full of Rye and Honest, in the lead role of Kacie Carter. She also appeared in the pilot episode of Life Is Wild, the American version of Wild at Heart. She also starred in adverts for dot tel. Haddock played the lead role of Natasha in the ITV1 comedy drama Monday Monday, and appears as Samantha in series two and three of How Not to Live Your Life, replacing previous female lead Sinéad Moynihan.

In 2011, she appeared in the Cinemax/Sky TV drama Strike Back: Project Dawn for two episodes, as the kidnapped daughter of an illegal arms dealer. She starred as Lucrezia Donati, the mistress of Lorenzo de' Medici and lover of Leonardo da Vinci in the 2013 series Da Vinci's Demons. 

Haddock's theatre credits include Famous Last, which formed part of the 2009 Sky Arts Theatre Live! project, and Rutherford & Son at Northern Stage. In 2014, she portrayed Meredith Quill in Guardians of the Galaxy, a role she reprised in its 2017 sequel Guardians of the Galaxy Vol. 2. She appears in the ITV series, The Level, and played Vivian Wembley in the 2017 Michael Bay film Transformers: The Last Knight.

In 2021, Haddock starred in a Christmas marketing campaign for British furniture and home accessories retailer OKA. In 2022, she starred as Maxine Meladze in the Netflix comedy drama The Recruit.

Personal life
Haddock married English actor Sam Claflin in July 2013 after they had dated for two years. They have a son born in 2015 and a daughter born in 2018. On 20 August 2019, Haddock and Claflin announced their legal separation.

Filmography

Film

Television

Stage

Awards and nominations

References

External links
 
 
 
 
 

Living people
1985 births

21st-century English actresses
Actresses from Hertfordshire
Actresses from London
English film actresses
English stage actresses
English television actresses
People educated at the Arts Educational Schools
People from Harpenden
People from Enfield, London